Halichoeres raisneri is a species of fish of the family Labridae, the wrasses. It was first formally named in 2001. The specific name raisneri is in honor of William R. Raisner, Jr., "a veteran pilot who lost his life in a tragic ultralight plane accident on 26 June 1998 during the expedition on which the new species was collected".

Distribution
It is found on the Galápagos Islands.

References

raisneri
Fish described in 1890
Taxa named by Charles Henry Gilbert